The 2014 Estonian Athletics Championships was the national championship in outdoor track and field for Estonia. It was held from 2–3 August at Kadriorg Stadium in Tallinn.

Results

Men

Women

References

 Results

Estonian Athletics Championships
Estonian Athletics Championships
Estonian Athletics Championships
Estonian Athletics Championships
Sports competitions in Tallinn